Gheorghe Dijmărescu (commonly known as George Dijmarescu) was a Romanian-American known for escaping from the Romanian dictator Nicolae Ceaușescu by swimming across Danube river, and for his mountaineering expeditions including summiting Mount Everest multiple times in the early 2000s.

Biography
Dijmărescu is noted for having summited Mount Everest nine times, a record for a western guide that was eventually overtaken by the American Dave Hahn in 2008. In 2004, he rescued a Mexican climber who was frostbitten; Dijmărescu and fellow climber David Watson organized the rescue of the Mexican, which Watson later noted as an example of what should have happened to David Sharp, who died high on Everest in 2006.

Dijmărescu married Lhakpa Sherpa in 2002, the first Nepali woman to summit Mount Everest and survive, who also has the record for the most summits of Mount Everest by a woman. They met in Kathmandu in the year 2000. From 2008, Dijmărescu battled with some health issues.

Some of Dijmărescu's life was described in the Michael Kodas' book High Crimes, about a 2004 Connecticut expedition to Mount Everest that Dijmărescu organized. In Kodas' book, Dijmărescu is portrayed as an angry, short-tempered, and violent man with dictatorial tendencies. Kodas described how he witnessed Dijmărescu beat his wife Lhakpa Sherpa in Everest's Tibetan base camp, and how he felt so threatened by Dijmărescu that he feared he would break into their tents at night and assault them. After returning to Connecticut, Kodas installed a security system at his home because he feared for his family's safety due to Dijmărescu's continued threats.

The marriage with Lhakpa Sherpa came apart in 2012 when Dijmarescu became violent, and beat her to the point she was taken to the emergency room; a hospital social worker placed her and her two girls in a local shelter where they stayed for eight months.

Danube escape
Dijmărescu survived a swim across the Danube to leave his native Romania. He could not even say goodbye to his parents; the swim took over an hour and was timed to avoid guards who had been known to kill those who tried to swim across. He managed to make his way through Yugoslavia and escape to Italy. From there he was granted political asylum in the United States, and eventually settled in New England.

Death
Gheorghe Dijmărescu died of cancer in September 2020 at the age of 58.

Dijmărescu's Mount Everest summit record
Dijmărescu summited Mount Everest:
May 26, 1999.
May 19, 2000
May 23, 2001
May 17, 2002
May 31, 2003
May 20, 2004
Jun 2, 2005
May 11, 2006
May 15, 2007

See also
List of 20th-century summiters of Mount Everest
List of Mount Everest summiters by number of times to the summit

References

External links
Everest 2004
Everest 2007

1960s births
2020 deaths
American summiters of Mount Everest
Romanian emigrants to the United States
Year of birth missing
Place of birth missing
Place of death missing